Reptilisocia gunungana is a species of moth of the family Tortricidae first described by Józef Razowski in 2013. It is found on Seram Island in Indonesia.

The wingspan is about 16 mm. The ground colour of the forewings is lemon yellow, spotted with orange and brown. The markings are orange with brown and refractive spots. The hindwings are white cream.

Etymology
The species name refers to Gunung Binaia, the type locality.

References

Moths described in 2013
Tortricini
Moths of Indonesia
Taxa named by Józef Razowski